Suragabad (also Romanized as Sūragābād; also known as Sharīkābād) is a village in Qaleh Ganj Rural District, in the Central District of Qaleh Ganj County, Kerman Province, Iran. At the 2006 census, its population was 645, in 118 families.

References 

Populated places in Qaleh Ganj County